Loreen may refer to:
Loreen (singer), Swedish singer
Loreen Rice Lucas (1914–2011), a Canadian author
"Loreen" (song), 1986 song by German singer Sandra

See also
Loren (disambiguation)
Lorene
Loreena